This is a list of Brynäs IF seasons.

External links
 Historical Statistics from the Swedish Ice Hockey Association

Bry